The playoffs are the post-season matches (usually to decide a championship) in various sports leagues.  

Playoff, play-off or playoffs may also refer to:

 One-game playoff, a single ad hoc tiebreaker match
 Playoff (golf), extra hole(s) played to break a tie
 Third place playoff, between losing semi-finalists in a knockout tournament
 Playoff Bowl, 1960s NFL third place playoff
 Football League play-offs, the post-season matches to decide promotion to the next division
 Playoff (film), a 2011 film
 "Playoffs?", a well-known postgame rant delivered by former NFL head coach Jim E. Mora

See also
 tiebreaker